Te Kumi railway station was a station on the North Island Main Trunk in New Zealand. The railway had been delayed by Māori opposition to it entering King Country and Te Kumi was one of the last places where such resistance was shown.

After being arrested at Parihaka in 1879, Ngāti Kinohaku were returned to Te Kumu, where they tried to establish a similar settlement. In March 1883, Charles Wilson Hursthouse was held at Te Kumi by Te Mahuki, whilst surveying for the railway. Te Mahuki posed for a photograph at Te Kumi in 1885, after serving a year of hard labour.

Te Kumi railway station opened with the section from Ōtorohanga to Te Kuiti, for which Coates & Metcalfe were the contractors, having started work in 1886. It opened on 2 September 1887 for goods and three months later for passengers, initially with two trains a week. £122.1s was spent on creating a shelter shed and platform for a flag station at Te Kumi. Railway houses were built in 1920.

It was in use from at least 1937 to 1987. There was no sign of a siding by 2001, though a caption on Flickr in 2016 mentioned lime transported in containers by rail from the works, now owned by Omya.

The lime and aggregates quarry was rebuilt in 1912 after a fire.

Just a single track and a sub station now remain.

References

External links 

 1885 photo of village and Mangaokewa Stream 
 Aerial photos in 1944 and 1963
 2020 photo of Te Huia coaches passing Te Kumi

Defunct railway stations in New Zealand
Rail transport in Waikato
Buildings and structures in Waikato